The 1917 All-Service football team consists of American football players selected to the all-service football teams chosen by various selectors.

All-Service players of 1917

Ends
 John Rasmussen, Nebraska; Camp Grant (WC-1)
 William Jennings Gardner, Carlisle; Camp Custer (WC-1)
 C. A. Coolidge, Harvard; Camp Devens (PPS)
 Fred Heyman, Washington & Jefferson; Sherman (PPS)
 B. C. Cubbage, Penn State; Allentown Ambulance Corps (NYT)
 George B. L. Green, Dartmouth; Newport Naval Reserves (NYT)
 Ellenberger, Cornell; Camp Dix (WC-2)
 Mitchell, Mare Island Marines (WC-2)
 Spike Dennie, Brown; Camp Funston (WC-3)
 Hunt, Coast Naval Res. (WC-3)

Tackles
 Belford West, Colgate; Camp Dix (College Football Hall of Fame) (WC-1, PPS)
 John Beckett, Oregon; Mare Island Marines (College Football Hall of Fame) (WC-1)
 Albert Benbrook, Michigan; Fort Sheridan (College Football Hall of Fame) (PPS)
 Pike Johnson, Washington & Lee; Allentown Ambulance Corps (NYT)
 Corbeau, Case; League Island Marines(NYT)
 Moriarty, Coast Naval Res. (WC-2)
 Hugh Blacklock, Mich. Ag; Great Lakes (WC-2)
 Robertson, Dartmouth; Dodge (WC-3)
 Zipper Lathrop, Notre Dame; Camp Grant (WC-3)

Guards
 Clinton Black, Yale; Newport Naval Reserves (WC-1, PPS, NYT)
 Chris Schlachter, Syracuse; Newport Naval Reserves (PPS, NYT)
 Ernest Allmendinger, Michigan; Fort Sheridan (WC-1)
 Allen Thurman, Virginia; Camp Jackson (WC-2)
 Paul Withington, Harvard; Camp Funston (WC-2)
 Snyder, Camp Lewis (WC-3)
 Holder, Camp Lewis (WC-3)

Centers
 John T. Callahan, Yale; Newport Naval Reserves (WC-1)
 Paul Des Jardien, Chicago; Fort Sheridan (College Football Hall of Fame) (PPS)
 Lud Wray, Penn; League Island Marines(NYT)
 Hommand, Kansas; Camp Funston (WC-2)
 White, Yale; Camp Jackson (WC-3)

Quarterbacks
 Ockie Anderson, Colgate; Camp Dix (WC-2; PPS)
 Raymond "Razor" Watkins, Colgate; Mineola Aviation (WC-1)
 Charles Thorne "Mike" Murphy, Yale; Allentown Ambulance Corps (NYT)
 Harry Costello, Georgetown; Camp Custer (WC-3)

Halfbacks
 Charley Barrett, Cornell; Newport Naval Reserves (WC-2, PPS, NYT)
 Eddie Casey, Harvard; Charlestown Navy Yard (College Football Hall of Fame) (WC-1)
 Wayland Minot, Harvard; Camp Devens (WC-1)
 Bernard Gerrish, Dartmouth; Newport Naval Reserves (PPS)
 Johnny Scott, Lafayette; League Island Marines(NYT)
 Fritz Shiverick, Cornell; Camp Grant (WC-2)
 Edmund O'Boyle, Georgetown; Pelham Naval (WC-3)
 Blair, Md.; Upton (WC-3)

Fullbacks
 Cedric C. Smith, Michigan; Great Lakes (WC-1)
 Eddie Mahan, Harvard; League Island Marines (College Football Hall of Fame) (PPS)
 Earl "Curley" Cramer, Hamline; Allentown Ambulance Corps (NYT)
 Maxfield, Lafayette, Ft. Slocum (WC-2)
 Thayer, Pa.; Meade (WC-3)

Key
 WC = Collier's Weekly All Service team as selected by Walter Camp
 PPS = Paul Purman's All Service selection
 NYT = All Service eleven of The New York Times.

 1 – First-team selection
 2 – Second-team selection
 3 – Third-team selection

See also
 1917 College Football All-America Team

References

All-Service Team